Audrey Frances Rutherford is a former international lawn bowler from Australia.

Bowls career
She won a gold medal in the women's fours with Daphne Shaw, Dorothy Roche and Marion Stevens at the 1990 Commonwealth Games in Auckland.

Two years later she won a silver medal in the singles at the 1992 World Outdoor Bowls Championship in Ayr.

She won four medals at the Asia Pacific Bowls Championships including two gold medals.

References

Australian female bowls players
Commonwealth Games gold medallists for Australia
Commonwealth Games medallists in lawn bowls
Bowls players at the 1990 Commonwealth Games
Living people
Year of birth missing (living people)
20th-century Australian women
Medallists at the 1990 Commonwealth Games